Beta (Translation: Son) is a 1992 Indian Hindi drama film, directed by Indra Kumar and written by Naushir Khatau and Kamlesh Pandey. It featured Anil Kapoor, Madhuri Dixit and Aruna Irani in lead roles. The soundtrack was composed by Anand-Milind. The film is known for its songs like "Dhak Dhak Karne Laga" and "Koyal Si Teri Boli".  The film is an official remake of 1987 Tamil film Enga Chinna Rasa written and directed by K. Bhagyaraj.

Beta released on 3 April 1992, and became the highest-grossing film of the year. It received positive reviews from critics upon release, with major praise directed towards the performances of Kapoor, Dixit and Irani,

At the 38th Filmfare Awards, Beta received a leading 9 nominations, including Best Film, Best Director (Kumar) and Best Music Director (Anand–Milind), and won a leading 5 awards, including Best Actor (Kapoor), Best Actress (Dixit) and Best Supporting Actress (Irani).

Plot

Raju (Anil Kapoor) is the only son of his wealthy land owning father Prem Chaudhary (Akash Khuranna). Raju had lost his mother at birth and feels deeply deprived of a mother's love.

On Raju's 5th birthday party, as a promised birthday gift, Prem brings home a new mother Lakshmi Devi (Aruna Irani), hoping that she will be a doting and caring mother for Raju. However, Lakshmi Devi turns out to be greedy, shrewd and cunning. She married Raju's father only for his vast fortune, money and property. Joining with her brother Totaram (Anupam Kher) and his wife Mynavati (Bharati Achrekar), they conspire on how to transfer all property to Lakshmi Devi's name. However, Lakshmi Devi and Totaram are enraged when they find out that Prem's first wife had prepared a will before her death transferring all property to Raju. And that Prem is only a trustee to all the wealth.  In the will, it has been written that Raju will have full control of his property only after marriage and unless his wife jointly consents with him, he will not be able to transfer his wealth and property to another name.

Lakshmi Devi begins her vile schemes. On the front, she puts up an act of being a very loving mother for Raju, who exhilarated for a mother's love, becomes a devoted son. He showers Lakshmi Devi with love and respect, ever-ready to obey her every word. In the process, unknowingly, he allows Lakshmi Devi to manipulate him. She very cunningly misleads Raju to give up his education. When his father finds out that Raju stopped going to school at Lakshmi Devi's instructions, he called out to her to question her. Lakshmi Devi and Totaram, hearing Prem, pours oil on the steps causing him to fall down the flight of stairs and hurting his head severely. Using this opportunity, they proved that Prem had become mentally unstable and locked him up in a corner room of the house.

Raju being naïve and uneducated, believed every word of his step-mother and her brother. Over the years, Lakshmi Devi increasingly isolated his aging father from the family and mainly Raju.

One day, Raju meets Saraswati (Madhuri Dixit) at a wedding and falls head over heels in love with her. After some pursuing and an intense incident in her village, Raju and Saraswati gets married. In the meantime, Lakshmi Devi fixes an alliance for Raju with an equally uneducated girl from their own village, so that she too can be manipulated and can finally succeed in transferring the property in Lakshmi Devi and her son, Ramesh (Adi Irani), Raju's step brother's name.

Lakshmi Devi is shocked to learn about Raju and Saraswati's marriage. Because Lakshmi Devi knew that Saraswati was not only educated but also a very intelligent girl. As usual, Lakshmi Devi puts on an act of a doting mother in front of Saraswati also. But Saraswati soon discovers that Lakshmi Devi, Totaram, Mainavati, Ramesh and his wife Kunika (Kunika) are all scammers and that their love for Raju is only a ruse. She challenges to expose their deceit to Raju.

First thing, Saraswati takes Prem to the temple thus releasing him from the confined room of 20 years. This bold step of Saraswati antagonised Lakshmi Devi. Lakshmi Devi clearly disapproved of her guts. But Saraswati successfully proved to all that his father was normal. Initially, Saraswati had to bear the brunt of Raju's anger when she tried to convince him of his mother's conniving intentions. After which, Saraswati cleverly exposed every one who had been cheating Raju over the years. For every attempt of Lakshmi Devi's schemes, Saraswati wittingly played and backfired their plans ensuring that Raju gets the message and yet not offended.

In one incident, Saraswati, along with Prem and their faithful servants Pandu (Lakshmi Devikant Berde) and Champa (Priya Arun), planned for Lakshmi Devi to slip and fall, forcing her to be bedridden. Promptly, the responsibility of the entire household is handed over to Saraswati. Lakshmi Devi is infuriated and plots to get rid of Saraswati just for rewards.

When Saraswati becomes pregnant, her father, Shyamlal (Satyen Kappu) comes home with hoards of sweets for her in-laws and a box of saffron. He requests that a pinch of saffron be mixed with milk and be given to Saraswati. Lakshmi Devi, adds poison to the box of saffron. She prepares the milk and tells the unaware Raju to give Saraswati the milk along with a pinch of the poisoned saffron. Champa, who witnessed Lakshmi Devi mixing the poison, runs to Saraswati's rescue, narrating everything that happened and warns her against drinking the poisoned milk. A devastated Saraswati informs Raju the same. But blinded by Lakshmi Devi's love, Raju not only refuses to believe her, he even accuses her of conspiring stories against his mother. In defense, Raju drinks the poisoned milk to prove to Saraswati her error. Raju's world comes crumbling down when he coughed up blood.

He, then recollected and realised that everything he had heard about Lakshmi Devi all these years from others were eventually true. Yet, Raju could not bring himself to hate Lakshmi Devi. His words to Lakshmi Devi before dying touched her deeply. Lakshmi Devi repented that her greed for wealth stretched a bit too far this time to the point of killing a son who had loved her with a true heart.

Saraswati, in the meantime, rushed to get a doctor. On returning she is told that if she wants Raju alive she will have to sign the property transfer papers. Saraswati agrees immediately. However, Lakshmi Devi forbids Saraswati from signing it and apologizes to her. A fight ensues between Lakshmi Devi and Ramesh. Totaram and Mynavati also joins with Ramesh. Ultimately, it required Raju himself to come forward to save Lakshmi Devi from being killed by Ramesh.

Eventually Raju recovers and hands over the signed property papers to Prem. He bids good-bye to his father, Pandu and Champa. He boards the vehicle with Saraswati to leave his home for good, when Lakshmi Devi begs him not to leave. To prove her remorse she rips up the papers and tells him that all she wants is nothing more than "her son". The family is happily reconciled.

Cast
 Anil Kapoor as Rajnath "Raju"
 Madhuri Dixit as Saraswati "Saru"
 Aruna Irani as Laxmi
 Laxmikant Berde as Pandu
 Anupam Kher as Totaram
 Priya Arun as Champa
 Akash Khurana as Premnath
 Kunika as Kunika
 Adi Irani as Ramesh
 Bharati Achrekar as Mainavati
 Rajeev Mehta as Groom
 Jack Gaud as Namdev

Soundtrack

The soundtrack of Beta was the second Best selling album of the year.  The song "Dhak Dhak Karne Laga" is based on "Abbanee Teeyani" from Jagadeka Veerudu Athiloka Sundari. Anand–Milind received a nomination for the Filmfare Award for Best Music Director, but lost out to Nadeem-Shravan for Deewana. Anuradha Paudwal won her third consecutive Filmfare Award for Best Female Playback Singer for the song "Dhak Dhak Karne Laga". Music directors Dilip Sen–Sameer Sen, Amar-Utpal and Naresh Sharma's compositions are included in the album but not in the film, nor are they credited in the film titles. Audio is available on T-Series.

Awards
38th Filmfare Awards:

Won
 Best Actor – Anil Kapoor
 Best Actress – Madhuri Dixit
 Best Supporting Actress – Aruna Irani
 Best Female Playback Singer – Anuradha Paudwal for "Dhak Dhak Karne Laga"
 Best Choreography – Saroj Khan for "Dhak Dhak Karne Laga"

Nominated
 Best Film – Indra Kumar, Ashok Thakeria
 Best Director – Indra Kumar
 Best Comedian – Laxmikant Berde
Best Music Director – Anand–Milind

References

External links
 

1992 romantic drama films
1990s Hindi-language films
Films directed by Indra Kumar
Films scored by Anand–Milind
1992 films
Indian romantic drama films
Films shot in Ooty
Hindi remakes of Tamil films